Ludwig 'Luggi' Müller (25 August 1941 – 24 June 2021) was a German professional footballer who played as a defender.

Club career 
He spent 11 seasons in the Bundesliga with 1. FC Nürnberg, Borussia Mönchengladbach and Hertha BSC.

International career 
Müller also played six games for the West Germany national team, including a 1970 FIFA World Cup qualifier against Cyprus and five friendlies.

Life after pro times 
He died on 24 June 2021 aged 79 in his home town of Haßfurt.

Honours
 Bundesliga: 1967–68, 1969–70, 1970–71

References

External links
 
 
 
 

1941 births
2021 deaths
German footballers
Association football defenders
Germany international footballers
1. FC Nürnberg players
Borussia Mönchengladbach players
Hertha BSC players
Bundesliga players
People from Haßfurt
Sportspeople from Lower Franconia
Footballers from Bavaria
20th-century German people